{{Infobox comedian
| name                = Hamish & Andy
| image               = Hamish & Andy - 2009 ARIA Awards.jpg
| imagesize           = 220px
| caption             = Andy Lee (left) and Hamish Blake (right) at the ARIA Music Awards of 2009
| pseudonym           =
| birth_date          =
| birth_place         =
| medium              = Television, radio, podcasting
| active              = 2003–present
| genre               = Comedy
| subject             =
| influences          =
| influenced          =
| domesticpartner     =
| notable_work        = {{hlist|
Hamish & Andy (radio show)|
Rove|
Hamish & Andy's Gap Year|
Caravan of Courage|
Hamish & Andy (podcast)|True Story with Hamish & Andy}}
| signature           =
| website             = 
| footnotes           =
}}
Hamish & Andy are an Australian comedy duo formed in 2003 by Hamish Blake and Andy Lee. Best known for their various drive time radio programmes on the Hit Network, which aired in multiple formats until 2017, their shows gained consistently high market share and became the highest rated radio show in Australian history. Retiring after 14 years of broadcasting, the duo now produce a weekly self-titled podcast and occasionally publish a secondary programme, the Remembering Project, to revisit their old radio segments.

The duo have also worked extensively in television, known as correspondents on Rove and for their various seasons of Hamish & Andy's Gap Year which won multiple Logie Awards including Most Popular Light Entertainment Program in 2012, 2014 and 2015.

They have made numerous appearances hosting events, competing on game shows and in celebrity sporting events. In 2014, the pair were the highest-paid commercial radio hosts in Australia, with individual salaries of A$4 million.

Background
The two met while Lee was studying Commerce and Blake was studying Commerce/Science at the University of Melbourne, and entered comedy competitions.

Radio career (2003–2017)

Hamish & Andy have presented radio programmes for Fox FM in a variety of formats since 2003.

The duo began presenting radio on the Student Youth Network, in the Friday afternoon drivetime slot. In 2003, soon after Hamish began writing for the Fox FM breakfast show (The Matt & Jo Show), the pair began hosting a Monday night late-night radio program called Almost Tuesday on the same station.  The duo then hosted the Fox FM program Almost Midday on Saturday mornings, which was so successful it was syndicated nationally across the Today Network. From 2006 until its change of format at the end of 2017, they have hosted the two-hour afternoon program Hamish & Andy, formerly The Hamish & Andy Show, on the Today Network in all states and territories of Australia and in New Zealand. A weekly highlights package was also broadcast in Dubai.

The duo presented two radio specials on BBC 6 Music in the United Kingdom on 21 December 2009 and 26 January 2010. On Friday 11 June, it was announced on the Christian O'Connell Breakfast Show that Hamish & Andy would be presenting three shows in London during July 2010 to cover O'Connell's holiday. Hamish and Andy signed a deal to present a series of shows to air on Absolute Radio Sunday evenings. On 18 May 2012, Hamish & Andy collaborated with Christian O'Connell for a one-off social experiment.

The Hamish & Andy Show

The duo have hosted a two-hour weekday show, The Hamish & Andy Show, since 2006. The show is broadcast in all the seven major cities of Australia, in the afternoon drivetime slot (and a compilation of the past week's best on Saturday mornings in New Zealand). The show is the highest-rated radio series in Australian history, with approximately two million listeners daily. The show is well known for its interstate and overseas trips. As of 2014, The Hamish & Andy Show had completed two domestic and two foreign caravan tours, a Bass Strait sailboat trip, and trips to Afghanistan, Beijing, Japan, India, and the US, recording live on location. The program has won 14 Australian Commercial Radio Awards.

The duo have released two compilation albums of segments from their daily radio show, Unessential Listening, in 2008 and Celebrating 50 Glorious Years in 2010. Both albums won ARIA Awards for Best Comedy Release.

Blake and Lee announced in August 2010 that they would be cutting down their show to a single program each week from 2011 onward, in the Friday afternoon drive time slot. The final daily program aired on 3 December 2010.

Business Brunch/Happy Hour
As of January 2013, the pair moved their weekly drive show from Fridays to Mondays from 4 p.m, and added a one-hour show from 9 a.m. Tuesdays through Fridays. This second show is known as Hamish & Andy's Business Brunch, during which they cover every single topic in the world, one topic per show. The list of topics for every week is updated the week before and listeners are encouraged to contribute any 'expertise' or assistance to the discussion of any particular topic covered on the show. This arrangement lasted six months, until they shifted to a one-hour program at 3 p.m. every weekday afternoon called Hamish & Andy's Happy Hour. Similar to the Business Brunch, it address one topic each day, but this topic is merely a starting point for the day's conversation.

 Podcasting career (2018–present) 

In December 2016, Hamish and Andy announced that they would be leaving radio at the end of 2017. In September 2017, Southern Cross Austereo announced that Hughesy & Kate would replace Hamish and Andy. The duo also later revealed that the podcast will continue in 2018, and the show has  continued in a weekly podcast-only format since 2018. As of 2022, there have been 200 episodes in five seasons.

 List of audio-based programmes 

Television career
Hamish & Andy have presented a number of television series and specials since 2003. They began on sketch shows but have found greater success in recent years with their travel diary-style programmes.

 Series
 Special

Early days
Blake united with Lee in 2003 when they developed a Channel 31 sketch show, called Radio Karate, with friends Ryan Shelton and Tim Bartley. Blake reunited with Lee in 2004 when they were named hosts of a new Seven Network variety program, Hamish and Andy, a show described as a successor to Big Bite. It premiered in 2004, and steadily built a moderate cult audience. However the show did not rate well and was cancelled after its initial run of six episodes.  The 2004 series was then given a repeat run on 7HD in 2007, and many clips survive from these reruns.

In 2020, it was revealed that the tapes for Hamish and Andy had been taped over by the Seven Network by Commonwealth Games broadcasts when asked if they still had them.

Rove and guest appearances

In 2005, they were recruited by comedian Rove McManus to develop a satirical television comedy series, Real Stories, which aired on Network Ten in 2006. From 2007 to 2009, the duo appeared fortnightly on Rove in a mixture of pre-recorded segments and live appearances. They hosted the Logie awards in 2007 and 2008 (and went on to open the 2013 and 2014 ceremonies), and the ARIA awards in 2008. They appeared on Joker Poker and Australia's Brainiest Comedian in 2005, Are You Smarter Than A 5th Grader? in 2009, and Good News Week in 2010. The group appeared on The Jay Leno Show twice in 2009,  and on The 7pm Project numerous times from 2009, in a similar manner as they did on Rove. They appeared on the UK's The Graham Norton Show in June 2010.

Network Ten specials
The duo have presented numerous televised clip show specials on Network Ten. Hamish and Andy: Re-Gifted at the end of 2008, and Hamish & Andy: Re-Gifted – Another Very Early Christmas Special at the end of 2009, were both produced in conjunction with Roving Enterprises and consisted mostly of highlights of their fortnightly appearances on Rove. Their 2010 Hamish & Andy's Reministmas Special served as a continuation of both and recapped many of their adventures during the year, mostly as part of their radio show.

In addition to these, they produced three travel specials for Ten. Hamish & Andy's American Caravan of Courage in 2009 (another Roving Enterprises co-production) summarised their two-week road-trip across the United States. Similarly, 2010's Hamish & Andy's Caravan of Courage: Great Britain and Ireland recapped their next caravan trip made as part of their radio show. Their third travel special, Learn India with Hamish & Andy, aired as part of the network's lead-up to the 2010 Commonwealth Games in Delhi.

Nine Network and Gap Year
Following a series of media reports, the pair confirmed in February 2011 that they had joined the Nine Network on a two-year contract, to produce Hamish and Andy's Gap Year. The show first aired on 28 July 2011. The show premiered to strong ratings and has since gone on to three more seasons (Hamish & Andy's Euro Gap Year in 2012 and Hamish & Andy's Gap Year Asia in 2013 and Hamish & Andy's Gap Year South America in 2014).

The pair also filmed a fifth Caravan of Courage adventure in 2012, in which they compared their home country, Australia, to their neighbours New Zealand in two 75-minute specials.

In December 2016, the duo announced that 2017 would be their last year on radio, in order to focus on television. They also announced an as yet unnamed TV show to be aired on the Nine Network in mid-2017. The duo advertised on their website and radio show, for listeners to contribute "great stories" for "The Great Stories Project" which was the basis of their 2017 television show True Story with Hamish & Andy on the Nine Network. The series was a success, and it was renewed for a second season in 2018.

The duo starred in the three-part series Hamish and Andy's “Perfect” Holiday in 2019, which documented their holiday across the United States and Canada.

Discography
 Albums 

Other projects

On 7 July 2007, they presented the Australian leg of Live Earth and appeared at the Melbourne Sound Relief concert in 2009. They played in the 2008 and 2009 E. J. Whitten Legends Game. They made a mockumentary short film, The Greystone 2800, that won the 2005 Melbourne Comedy Festival Short Film competition. They also hosted FHM's Search for Australia's Funniest Man.

They had minor acting roles on the soap opera Neighbours, portraying radio presenters Fred and Big Tommo on the episode dated 27 August 2008. The episode featured them promoting university drop-out Ty Harper's (Dean Geyer) band, and interviewing schoolgirls Rachel Kinski (Caitlin Stasey) and Donna Freedman (Margot Robbie) about their situation with Harper. They make a cameo appearance in the 2010 short film IA: Interview Artist.

They have also made appearances on many Austereo radio shows, occasionally filling in for Kyle & Jackie O, Matt & Jo, or Fifi and Jules when a regular presenter fell ill.

Hamish and Andy hosted "the richest horse suit race in Australia" in the small Victorian country town of Wedderburn, Victoria. It drew about 7,000 people and featured performances by themselves, Jessica Mauboy, and Birds of Tokyo.

Awards and nominations
ARIA Music Awards
The ARIA Music Awards are a set of annual ceremonies presented by Australian Recording Industry Association (ARIA), which recognise excellence, innovation, and achievement across all genres of the music of Australia. They commenced in 1987.

! 
|-
| 2009 || Unessential Listening || rowspan="2"| ARIA Award for Best Comedy Release ||  || rowspan="2"| 
|-
| 2011 || Celebrating 50 Glorious Years'' ||  
|-

References

External links

Hamish & Andy's official site
Real Stories

 
ARIA Award winners
Australian male comedians
Australian radio presenters
RMITV alumni